Chrysopsis scabrella, called the Coastalplain goldenaster,  is a North American species of flowering plant in the family Asteraceae. It is native primarily to Florida with a few isolated populations in North and South Carolina.

Chrysopsis scabrella is a biennial herb up to 100 cm (40 inches) tall. Most of the leaves are in a rosette close to the ground. There is usually only one flowering stalk, but it can hold as many as 100 yellow flower heads in a loose array. Heads contain both ray florets and disc florets. The species grows in open areas such as fields, roadsides, and savannahs.

References

External links
Encyclopedia of Life

scabrella
Endemic flora of the United States
Flora of Florida
Flora of North Carolina
Flora of South Carolina
Plants described in 1842
Taxa named by Asa Gray
Taxa named by John Torrey